Un secreto de Esperanza (released under A Beautiful Secret in English-speaking countries) is a 2002 Mexican film written and directed by Leopoldo Laborde and starring Katy Jurado, Imanol, Jaime Aymerich and Ana de la Reguera. It is an example of a cinematic homage for the last screen appearance of Katy Jurado. This film captures the magical realism of Mexico as well as telling a genuinely touching tale about the unlikeliest of friendships.

It won several awards in film festivals around the world.

See also
A Rumor of Angels

External links
 

2002 films
Mexican drama films
2000s Spanish-language films
2002 drama films
Estudios Churubusco films
Magic realism films
2000s Mexican films